New York's 34th congressional district was a congressional district for the United States House of Representatives in New York. It was created in 1843 as a result of the 1840 Census, eliminated after the 1850 Census, and then re-created in 1885 due to the 1880 Census. It was eliminated most recently as a result of the 1990 Census. It was last represented by Amo Houghton who was redistricted into the 31st District.

Past components
1983–1993:
All of Allegany, Chautauqua, Chemung, Schuyler, Steuben, Yates
Parts of Cattaraugus, Tompkins
1973–1983:
All of Wayne
Parts of Monroe
1971–1973:
All of Cayuga, Ontario, Schuyler, Seneca, Yates
Parts of Livingston, Onondaga, Oswego, Tompkins
1963–1971:
All of Onondaga
1953–1963:
All of Herkimer, Madison, Oneida
1945–1953:
All of Franklin, Herkimer, Jefferson, Lewis, St. Lawrence
1913–1945:
All of Broome, Chenango, Delaware, Otsego
1885–1913:
All of Allegany, Cattaraugus, Chautauqua

List of members representing the district

Recent election results
The following chart shows historic election results.

References
 
 
 Congressional Biographical Directory of the United States 1774–present
 Election Statistics 1920–present Clerk of the House of Representatives

34
Former congressional districts of the United States
Constituencies established in 1843
1843 establishments in New York (state)
Constituencies established in 1885
1885 establishments in New York (state)
Constituencies disestablished in 1853
1853 disestablishments in New York (state)
Constituencies disestablished in 1993
1993 disestablishments in New York (state)